Sebastian County is a county located in the U.S. state of Arkansas. As of the 2020 census, the population was 127,799, making it the fourth-most populous county in Arkansas. The county has two county seats, Greenwood and Fort Smith.

Sebastian County is part of the Fort Smith, AR-OK Metropolitan Statistical Area.

History
Sebastian County is Arkansas's 56th county, formed on January 6, 1851, and named for William K. Sebastian, United States Senator from Arkansas.

Geography
It is the second-smallest county by area in Arkansas.

Major highways

 Interstate 49
 Interstate 540
 U.S. Highway 64
 U.S. Highway 71
 U.S. Highway 271
 State Route 10
 State Route 22
 State Route 45
 State Route 59
 State Route 96

Adjacent counties
Crawford County (north)
Franklin County (east)
Logan County (southeast)
Scott County (south)
Le Flore County, Oklahoma (southwest)
Sequoyah County, Oklahoma (northwest)

National protected areas
 Fort Smith National Historic Site (part)
 Ouachita National Forest (part)

Demographics

2020 census

As of the 2020 United States census, there were 127,799 people, 51,384 households, and 32,517 families residing in the county.

2000 census
As of the 2000 United States Census, there were 115,071 people, 45,300 households, and 30,713 families residing in the county. There were 49,311 housing units at an average density of 92 per square mile (36/km2). The racial makeup of the county was 82.34% White, 6.16% Black or African American, 1.57% Native American, 3.51% Asian, 0.05% Pacific Islander, 3.71% from other races, and 2.67% from two or more races.  6.70% of the population were Hispanic or Latino of any race. 19.6% were of American, 12.6% German, 11.0% Irish and 9.0% English ancestry according to Census 2000. 5.49% reported speaking Spanish at home, while 1.47% speak Vietnamese and 0.97% Lao.

In 2000 there were 45,300 households, out of which 32.80% had children under the age of 18 living with them, 52.40% were married couples living together, 11.30% had a female householder with no husband present, and 32.20% were non-families. 27.50% of all households were made up of individuals, and 10.00% had someone living alone who was 65 years of age or older.  The average household size was 2.49 and the average family size was 3.04.

In the county, the population was spread out, with 26.00% under the age of 18, 9.20% from 18 to 24, 29.50% from 25 to 44, 22.30% from 45 to 64, and 13.00% who were 65 years of age or older.  The median age was 36 years. For every 100 females, there were 95.30 males.  For every 100 females age 18 and over, there were 92.10 males.

The median income for a household in the county was $33,889, and the median income for a family was $41,303. Males had a median income of $30,056 versus $22,191 for females. The per capita income for the county was $18,424.  About 10.40% of families and 13.60% of the population were below the poverty line, including 18.60% of those under age 18 and 10.00% of those age 65 or over.

As of 2010 census the population of Sebastian County was 125,744.  The racial makeup of the county was 72.83% Non-Hispanic white, 6.24% Non-Hispanic black, 1.88% Native American, 4.06% Asian, 0.09% Pacific Islander, 0.07% Non-Hispanics of some other race, 2.78% Non-Hispanics reporting two or more races and 12.82% Hispanics.

Government

'''Politics

Whereas most of Arkansas was overwhelmingly blue up to the mid-2000s, Sebastian has been a solidly Republican county at the presidential level since Dwight Eisenhower won it in 1952. Since that election, no Democrat has ever again carried this county, though native son Bill Clinton came within less than 1,000 votes of doing so during both of his campaigns. Jimmy Carter is the only other Democrat to come reasonably close to winning the county. However, Democrats continued to split most local offices and state legislative seats with Republicans well into the 1990s. While Fort Smith has elected Democratic mayors and still elects some Democrats to the state legislature, the rest of the county is powerfully Republican.

Education
Public education is provided by several school districts (listed below from largest to smallest):

 Fort Smith School District
 Greenwood School District
 Lavaca School District
 Hackett School District
 Hartford School District

Communities

Cities

Barling
Bonanza
Fort Smith (county seat)
Greenwood (county seat)
Hackett
Hartford
Huntington
Lavaca
Mansfield

Towns
Central City
Midland

Townships

 Bass Little (some of Greenwood)
 Big Creek (Lavaca)
 Beverly
 Bloomer
 Center (most of Greenwood)
 Cole (Hackett)
 Dayton
 Diamond (Huntington)
 Fort Chafee UT (part of Barling, part of Fort Smith)
 Hartford (Hartford)
 Island
 Jim Fork (Midland)
 Lon Norris (part of Fort Smith)
 Marion (Bonanza, small part of Fort Smith)
 Mississippi
 Mont Sandels (Central City, most of Barling)
 Prairie
 Rogers
 Sugarloaf (part of Mansfield)
 Upper (most of Fort Smith)
 Washburn
 White Oak

Notable people

John Sebastian Little, member of the United States House of Representatives and the 21st Governor of the U.S. state of Arkansas
Mathew Pitsch, Republican member of the Arkansas House of Representatives for Sebastian County

See also
 List of lakes in Sebastian County, Arkansas
 National Register of Historic Places listings in Sebastian County, Arkansas

References

External links
 Sebastian County, Arkansas entry on the Encyclopedia of Arkansas History & Culture
Sebastian County official website

 
1851 establishments in Arkansas
Populated places established in 1851
Fort Smith metropolitan area